Amphiprion omanensis (Oman anemonefish) is a  marine fish belonging to the family Pomacentridae, the clownfishes and damselfishes.

Characteristics of Anemonefish 

Clownfish or anemonefish are  fishes  that, in the wild, form symbiotic mutualisms with sea anemones and are unaffected by the stinging tentacles of the host anemone, see .  The sea anemone protects the clownfish from predators, as well as providing food through the scraps left from the anemone's meals and occasional dead anemone tentacles. In return, the clownfish defends the anemone from its predators, and parasites. Clownfish are small-sized, and depending on species, they are overall yellow, orange, or a reddish or blackish color, and many show white bars or patches. Within species there may be color variations, most commonly according to distribution, but also based on sex, age and host anemone.  Clownfish are found in warmer waters of the Indian and Pacific oceans and the Red Sea in sheltered reefs or in shallow lagoons.

In a group of clownfish, there is a strict dominance hierarchy. The largest and most aggressive fish is female and is found at the top. Only two clownfish, a male and a female, in a group reproduce through external fertilization. Clownfish are sequential hermaphrodites, meaning that they develop into males first, and when they mature, they become females.

Description
The body of A. omanensis is dark brown and with two white bars and distinctive forked caudal fin, which is blackish in juveniles fading to white in adults. The midbody bar is narrow and does not extend onto the dorsal fin while the headbar is also narrow and usually constricted across the nape They have 10 dorsal spines, 2 anal spines,  10-17 dorsal soft rays and 14-15 anal soft rays.

Color variations
None known.

Similar species
The white forked caudal fin is distinctive, with only A. latifasciatus having a forked caudal fin, however A. omanensis has a narrow midbody bar, white caudal fin and black pelvic and anal fins while A. latifasciatus has a much wider midbody bar, and yellow fins.

Distribution and Habitat
A. omanensis is found in Oman in the Arabian Peninsula.. Anemone fish are sedentary and depend on ocean currents for dispersal. Adults provide high levels of parental care to their young that hatch with well-developed swimming and sensory capabilities before embarking on a <3 week pelagic larval phase, during which time they may disperse over long distances. The study found an asymmetrical dispersal pattern between the two regions with a higher occurrence of southward dispersal, consistent with the prevailing currents, with immigration rates of 5.4% in the south and 0.7% in the north.

Host anemones
A. omanensis is associated with the following species of anemone:

Entacmaea quadricolor Bubble-tip anemone
Heteractis crispa Sebae anemone

References

External links

 
 

Pomacentridae
omanensis
Fish described in 1991